Jose Almeida may refer to:

 José Joaquim Almeida (1777–1832), Portuguese-American privateer
 José Sebastião de Almeida Neto (1841–1920), Portuguese Cardinal of the Catholic Church
 José Ferraz de Almeida Júnior (1850–1899), Brazilian artist and designer
 José Simões de Almeida (sobrinho) (1880–1950), Portuguese sculptor
 José Américo de Almeida (1887–1980), Brazilian writer, politician and lawyer
 José de Almeida (1904–unknown), Brazilian sprinter
 José Augusto Pinto de Almeida (born 1937), known as José Augusto, Portuguese football manager and former winger
 José Antônio Rezende de Almeida Prado (1943–2010), Portuguese composer and pianist
 José António Rondão Almeida (born 1945), Portuguese politician
 José Maria de Almeida (born 1957), Brazilian politician
 José E. Almeida (born 1961), Brazilian businessman
 Jose Almeida (footballer) (born 1979), Brazilian football striker

See also
 Almeida Garrett, (João Baptista da Silva Leitão de Almeida Garrett, 1st Viscount of Almeida Garrett, 1799–1854), Portuguese poet, orator, playwright, novelist, journalist, politician, and a peer of the Realm